The 2013 Arab Clubs Championship was the 31st edition of the Arab Clubs Championship for volleyball tournament.  It was held in Beirut, Lebanon.

Group stage
The draw was held on 12 January 2013.

Pool A

|}

{{Vb res 5|5 Feb|14:00|''Al-Ahly Tripoli |3–1| Nadi Al Peshmerga|26–24|22–25|25–21|25–21||98–91|}}
|}

Pool B

|}

|}

Pool C

|}

|}

Pool D

|}

|}

Knockout stage

Quarterfinals

|}

Semifinals

|}

Final

|}

Final standing

AwardsBest Scorer:  Ahmed Nassir (Club Jeunesse Bauchrieh)Best Spiker:  Noureddine Hfaiedh (CS Sfaxien)Best Blocker:  Hakim Zouari (CS Sfaxien)Best Server:  Cristiano Campos (Club Jeunesse Bauchrieh)Best Setter:  Abdallah Bouften (Kazma Sporting Club)Best Receiver:  Anouer Taouerghi (CS Sfaxien)Best Digger:'''  Abdelaziz Salim (Kazma Sporting Club)
Source: fivb.org, 11.02.2013

References
  Results of the Arabian Volleyball Clubs Champions 2013 (goalzz.comm)

External links
 Official Arab Volleyball Association website

Arab Clubs Championship (volleyball)